Joseph Ronald Serafini (born January 22, 1998) is an American actor. He plays Seb Matthew-Smith in the Disney+ series High School Musical: The Musical: The Series.

Early life and education
Serafini is from Bethel Park, Pennsylvania, a suburb of Pittsburgh. He was a longtime performer at the Pittsburgh CLO Academy (Pittsburgh Civic Light Opera), where he performed with their "Mini Stars" touring vocal group and earned a Gene Kelly Award scholarship. He graduated from Bethel Park High School in 2016. He graduated from the University of Michigan in 2020.

Career
During his time with the Pittsburgh Civic Light Opera (CLO), he performed in several productions including A Musical Christmas Carol, Peter Pan, or The Boy Who Would Not Grow Up, Oliver!, Les Misérables, The Sound of Music, Into the Woods, and Anything Goes. He currently teaches master classes there. Outside of the CLO, his stage roles include The Music Man concert at Kennedy Center Concert Hall in Washington D.C. and The Burnt Part Boys with the Bald Theatre Company. He won a Level II Theatre Award at National YoungArts Week in Miami.

Serafini has starred in children's series Scientastic! He began starring in the recurring role Seb Matthew-Smith in Disney+ series High School Musical: The Musical: The Series in 2019. That December, it was announced he would be promoted to series regular for season 2. Serafini appeared in a guest role in the third season. On September 23, 2022, he and Andrew Barth Feldman released "In My Head", a duet written by songwriters Daniel Mertzlufft and Jacob Ryan Smith about the budding romance between two young men.

Personal life
In 2020, Serafini stated that he is "bisexual, if I have to give a label." Since late 2019 Serafini has been in a relationship with fellow High School Musical: The Musical: The Series actor Frankie Rodriguez, who plays his character's love interest on the show.

Stage

Filmography

References

External links 
 

1998 births
21st-century American male actors
American male musical theatre actors
American male web series actors
Bisexual male actors
LGBT people from Pennsylvania
Living people
People from Bethel Park, Pennsylvania
University of Michigan School of Music, Theatre & Dance alumni
American bisexual actors